The Gita, or the Bhagavad Gita, is a Sanskrit text, part of the Mahabharata.

Gita or Geeta may also refer to:

Music
 Gita (album), an album by Raul Seixas
 Geeta (album), an album by Charles Lloyd
Mahāgīta, the complete corpus of Burmese classical songs

Places
 Gita, Stara Zagora Province, a village in Stara Zagora Province, Bulgaria
 Gita, Israel, a village

People with the surname
 Oshri Gita (born 1985), Israeli footballer

Other uses
 GITA, Global Innovation & Technology Alliance, established by the Technology Development Board of India
 Gita (given name) or Geeta, an Indian feminine given name (including a list of persons with the name)
 Gita (elephant), an Asian elephant at the Los Angeles Zoo whose death ired animal rights activists
Gita (mobile carrier), a cargo-carrying robot
 Gita Press, a publisher of Hindu religious texts
 Cyclone Gita, 2018 South Pacific cyclone
 Geeta (1940 film), an Indian Bollywood film

See also
 Avadhuta Gita
 Ashtavakra Gita
 Devi Gita
 Ganesha Gita, from the Sanskrit text Ganesha Purana#Kridakhanda: The Ganesha Gita
 Geeta Bhawan, suburb of Indore, India
 Gita Govinda, a poem by Jayadeva Goswami
 Gita Jayanti, the day of the legendary manifestation of the Bhagavad Gita, celebrated annually
 Uddhava Gita
 Yogi Gita